The 2014 New York Attorney General election took place on November 4, 2014, to elect the Attorney General of New York. The incumbent Democratic Attorney General Eric Schneiderman won reelection to a second term in office, defeating Republican John P. Cahill.

Background
Incumbent Democratic attorney general Andrew Cuomo declined to run for reelection in 2010, instead successfully running for Governor. State Senator Eric Schneiderman narrowly won the Democratic primary and then won the general election by a wide margin.

In 2014, all statewide offices in New York were held by Democrats. Republicans believed that their best chance of winning a statewide election in 2014 rested on defeating Schneiderman, citing Governor Cuomo's high approval ratings and large campaign war chest and the belief that Comptroller Thomas DiNapoli was unlikely to be vulnerable because "Comptrollers seem to get re-elected as long as they do their jobs." Schneiderman has used his designation as Republicans' "top target" to raise money.

Governing did not believe Schneiderman would be defeated in 2014. A March 2013 article listed the 2014 New York attorney general election as "not competitive", citing the high-profile cases Schneiderman had taken on. A December 2013 article rated the race as "Safe Democratic", stating that "Schneiderman should have no problem winning a second term."

Democratic primary

Candidates

Nominated
 Eric Schneiderman, incumbent attorney general

Withdrew
 Aniello "Neil" Grimaldi (removed from ballot)

Republican primary

Candidates

Nominated
 John P. Cahill, attorney and former chief of staff for Governor George Pataki

Declined
 Michael A. Battle, former Director of the Executive Office for United States Attorneys and former United States Attorney for the Western District of New York
 Daniel M. Donovan, Jr., District Attorney of Richmond County and nominee for Attorney General in 2010
 Michael J. Garcia, former United States Attorney for the Southern District of New York
 Randy Mastro, attorney and former chief of staff to Rudy Giuliani
 Marc Mukasey, attorney and son of former United States Attorney General Michael Mukasey
 Dennis Vacco, former attorney general

Major third parties
Besides the Democratic and Republican parties, the Conservative, Green, Independence and Working Families parties all enjoyed automatic ballot access as qualified New York parties in 2014.

Conservative

Candidates

Nominated
 John P. Cahill, Republican nominee

Green

Candidates

Nominated
 Ramon Jimenez, attorney from The Bronx

Independence

Candidates

Nominated
 Eric Schneiderman, incumbent attorney general

Working Families

Candidates

Nominated
 Eric Schneiderman, incumbent attorney general

Minor third parties
Any political party other than the six qualified New York parties (Democratic, Republican, Conservative, Green, Independence and Working Families) was required to petition their way onto the ballot.

Libertarian

Candidates

Nominated
 Carl Person, nominee for Attorney General in 2010, candidate for President of the United States in 2012 and Reform Party nominee for Mayor of New York City in 2013

Stop Common Core

Candidates

Nominated
 John P. Cahill, Republican nominee

Women's Equality

Candidates

Nominated
 Eric Schneiderman, incumbent attorney general

General election

Polling

◆ Internally-conducted poll for the John P. Cahill campaign that he was required by state law to publish after parts of the poll were revealed in a fundraising appeal.

Results

References

External links
New York Attorney General election, 2014 at Ballotpedia

Attorney General
New York Attorney General elections
New York